25band is an Iranian music band originating from Mashhad, Iran. The band was formed in 2010 by Tamin (Tahmineh تهمینه) along with A-del (Adel عادل) as the vocalists. The name 25band means Tus, the city that the couple are from. 2 (Tu) and 5 because of its resemblance of S.

25band started in 2010 with their debut single Vaghte Parvaz (Time to Fly). Their style is a mixture of pop/electro as well as R&B, Hiphop, Jazz, Pop and Trance with Persian traditional music. They currently live in Los Angeles, California. The name 25band comes from Tus, Iran (old name of Mashhad) where both Tamin & A-del have originated from. 25band try to infuse Persian music with today's modern western style and create a unique mixture & combination.

They also had interviews with Iranian media such as BBC Persian, VOA Persian, Farsi1, Gem TV and Manoto.

Albums

EPs

Singles 

 Delam Aab Shod (2020)
 Jo Gandomi (2019)
 Jane Janan (2018)
 Divoonegi (2018)
 Naro (2018)
 Baroon (2017)
 Enghad Bekhand (2016)
 Tooye Rahe Eshghim (2015)
 Az Pisham Miri (2014)
 Baash Ta Bebini (2014)
 Hamishe Ba Hamim (2013)
 Gaahi Vaghtaa (2012)

Concerts

25band at Casa Vertigo in Los Angeles Bavar Album Release Celebration 20 Dec 2015 United States of America 
25band in Chicago 5 Sep 2015 United States of America
25band at Hard Rock Hotel in Las Vegas 25 Dec 2014 United States of America
 Persian New Year Concert at Black Magic Hall, 20 March 2012, Kuala Lumpur, Malaysia.
 25band at KL Live, 14 September 2012, Kuala Lumpur, Malaysia.
 25band at Chancery Pavilion Hall, 6 June 2013, Bangalore, India.
 25band at The Forum concert hall, 16 Feb 2014, London, UK.
 25band at Dubai World Trade Center, 30 July 2014, Dubai, UAE.

References

External links
25band OFFICIAL Website
25band OFFICIAL Soundcloud Page

Musical groups established in 2009
Iranian musical duos
Persian musicians
2009 establishments in Iran
Iranian singer-songwriters